Stephen II (1101 – early 1131), King of Hungary and Croatia, ruled from 1116 until 1131. His father, King Coloman, had him crowned as a child, thus denying the crown to his uncle Álmos. In the first year of his reign, Venice occupied Dalmatia and Stephen never restored his rule in that province. His reign was characterized by frequent wars with neighbouring countries.

Early years (till 1116)
Stephen and his twin brother, Ladislaus, were sons of the Hungarian king Coloman by his wife, Felicia of Sicily. According to the Illuminated Chronicle, they were born "... in the year of our Lord 1101." Stephen was named after the first king of Hungary, who had been canonized in 1083, implying that he was his father's heir from birth. A document written in Zadar in approximately 1105 AD makes mention of "Stephen, our most renowned king" along with Coloman, proving that the latter had his four-year-old son crowned king.

By the time of Stephen's coronation, Coloman had demonstrated his intention to secure the succession for his son. Coloman's ambitious brother, Álmos  who had already rebelled against the king in 1098  opposed this plan and left Hungary. He first sought the assistance of Henry V, Holy Roman Emperor, followed by an appeal to Duke Boleslaw III of Poland. When all of his efforts ended in failure, Álmos submitted to Coloman and returned to Hungary,  although he made several abortive attempts to dethrone Coloman in the following decade. In order to bring an end to the threat these plots presented to Stephen's succession, Coloman had Álmos and Álmos's young son, Béla, blinded.

When he fell gravely ill in early 1116, Coloman also had his brother imprisoned. The Illuminated Chronicle narrates that the dying king "instructed his son and his great men" to invade Rus' in order to take vengeance for Coloman's failure in the 1099 siege of Peremyshl (Przemyśl), Poland.  Coloman died on 3 February 1116.

Reign

Wars and internal conflicts (1116–1127)

Stephen was crowned king by Archbishop Lawrence of Esztergom in Székesfehérvár within thirty days of his father's death. His peaceful succession showed the effectiveness of the measures Coloman had implemented to prevent Álmos from usurping the throne.  Upon his councilor's advice, Stephen initiated a meeting with Vladislaus I, Duke of Bohemia, in order to improve the countries' relations, which had deteriorated in the previous decade. The two monarchs met on the river Olšava, which marked the border of their realms. However, the lack of mutual confidence hindered the opening of negotiations, leading to armed conflicts which evolved into a battle on 13 May. On the battlefield, the Bohemian army inflicted a serious defeat on Stephen's troops. The contemporaneous Cosmas of Prague blamed the young king's advisors for the fiasco, but later medieval Hungarian chronicles  all completed under kings descending from Stephen's opponent, Álmos  wrote that the king acted without consulting his advisors "... for he was of an impetuous nature".

Doge Ordelafo Faliero, who had conquered an island in the Gulf of Kvarner during the last year of Coloman's reign, returned to Dalmatia at the head of the Venetian fleet in May 1116. On 15 July, he vanquished the Hungarian troops which had arrived to relieve Zadar. Thereafter all towns  including Biograd na Moru, Šibenik, Split, and Trogir  surrendered to Venice, terminating Stephen II's suzerainty along the coastline of the Adriatic Sea. However, in either 1117 or 1118, the Hungarian troops were able to defeat the Venetians, during which Ordelafo Faliero himself died at a battle near Zadar, enabling Biograd na Moru, Split, and Trogir to rejoin the sovereignty of the Hungarian monarch. However, the new doge, Domenico Michele, invaded and reconquered all Dalmatia. A five-year truce, which was concluded in 1117 or 1118, confirmed the status quo: the seizure of Dalmatia by Venice.   

Stephen's troops launched a plundering raid into Austria in 1118, provoking a counter-attack by Leopold III, Margrave of Austria, later that same year. Bořivoj II, Duke of Bohemia, supported Leopold and pillaged the northwestern regions of the Kingdom of Hungary. Despite this, when Vladislaus I dethroned his brother Bořivoj in 1120, Bořivoj fled to Hungary and settled at Stephen's court.

Stephen married a daughter of Robert I of Capua, in the early 1120s. Historian Paul Stephenson wrote that Stephen's marriage alliance with the Normans of Southern Italy "... must have been partly directed against the Venetians." The Norman princes of Capua had been the pope's staunch supporters during the Investiture Controversy, suggesting that his marriage also continued his father's pro-Papal foreign policy. According to Włodzimierz Dworzaczek, Stephen in 1121 married Adelhaid, daughter of Heinrich, burgrave of Regensburg.

Stephen's cousin and the daughter of his uncle Álmos, Adelaide, whose husband Soběslav had been expelled from Moravia, arrived in Hungary in early 1123. According to Cosmas of Prague, Stephen "kindly received her ... acknowledging her as his relative", which implies that his relations with his uncle were cordial around that time. In the same year, the young king launched a military expedition against the Principality of Volhynia in order to assist its expelled prince, Iaroslav Sviatopolkovich, regain his throne. Even though Sviatopolchich was assassinated at the beginning of the siege of his former seat, Volodymyr-Volynskyi, Stephen decided to continue the war. However, according to the Illuminated Chronicle, his commanders threatened to dethrone him if he continued the aggression, forcing Stephen to lift the siege and return to Hungary.

Taking advantage of the absence of the Venetian fleet from the Adriatic Sea because of a naval expedition in the Levant, Stephen invaded Dalmatia in the first half of 1124. His charter confirming the liberation of Split and Trogir in July 1124 is evidence that the central regions of Dalmatia returned to his rule. However, upon the return of the Venetian armada the Dalmatian towns once again surrendered, one after another. According to the Historia Ducum Veneticorum, only the citizens of Biograd na Moru "... dared resist the doge and his army ...", but "... their city was razed to its foundations."

According to the Illuminated Chronicle, the blind Álmos, "... fearing death at the hands of King Stephen ...", fled to the Byzantine Empire. Many of his partisans followed him, and Emperor John II Komnenos settled them in a town in Macedonia. The Byzantine historian John Kinnamos confirmed that the emperor looked upon Álmos "... favorably and received him with kindness." He added that Stephen "sent his envoys to the emperor and demanded that ...[Álmos]... be expelled from" the Byzantine Empire, but his request was rejected. The sources do not specify the date which Álmos's fled, but it likely occurred circa 1125. Historian Ferenc Makk wrote that Álmos was forced to flee from Hungary because he had taken advantage of Stephen's failures in Volhynia and Dalmatia, and conspired against Stephen.

Stephen met Soběslav, the new duke of Bohemia, in October 1126. Their meeting brought an end to the hostilities between their two states. Around the same year, Stephen also concluded an agreement with Archbishop Conrad I of Salzburg.

Last years (1127–1131)

According to the Byzantine chronicler Niketas Choniates, the citizens of the Byzantine town Braničevo "attacked and plundered the Hungarians who had come to" the Byzantine Empire "to trade, perpetrating the worst crimes against them." In retaliation, Stephen decided to wage war against the Byzantine Empire. The Illuminated Chronicle relates that the childless Stephen "... so ordered the succession to the throne that after his death the son of his sister Sophia, by name Saul, should reign." The chronicle does not specify the date of this event, but Ferenc Makk says that Stephen most probably declared Saul as his heir during the first half of 1127, before storming the Byzantine Empire.

Stephen broke into the empire in the summer. His troops sacked Belgrade, Braničevo and Niš, and plundered the regions around Serdica (Sofia, Bulgaria) and Philippopolis (Plovdiv, Bulgaria), before returning to Hungary. In response, Emperor John II marched against Hungary in 1128, where he defeated the royal troops in a battle at Haram, and "captured Frangochorion, the richest land in Hungary" (now in Serbia). Stephen was unable to participate in the fighting because "he happened to be sickly in body and was recuperating someplace in the midst of his land", according to John Kinnamos. The Illuminated Chronicle said that his illness was so serious that "all expected his death." The chronicle added that "traitors" went so far as to elect two kings, the "Counts Bors and Ivan". Upon regaining his health, Stephen had Ivan executed and expelled Bors from his kingdom.

John Kinnamos wrote of a second campaign by Stephen against the Byzantine Empire. The Hungarian troops, supported by Czech reinforcements under the command of Duke Vaclav of Olomouc, took Braničevo by storm and destroyed its fortress. Emperor John II Komnenos was forced to retreat and sue for peace. Historian Ferenc Makk writes that the resulting peace treaty was signed in October 1129.

For many years, Stephen believed that his cousin, Béla, had died after being blinded on the orders of Stephen's father. Having learnt, around 1129, that Béla was alive, the king "... rejoiced with great joy ...", according to the Illuminated Chronicle. He even granted Béla the town of Tolna and arranged Béla's marriage with Helena of Rascia.

The Illuminated Chronicle recounts that Stephen showed blatant favoritism towards the "Comans", identified as Pechenegs or Cumans by historians, who had arrived in Hungary in the 1120s. In his last years, he even tolerated the crimes they committed against his subjects, causing a revolt. Before his death, Stephen "... laid aside his royal state and took the habit of a monk ...". He died of dysentery in the spring of 1131. No source recorded the exact date of his death, but most of his biographies wrote that he died on 1 March. He was buried in the Várad Cathedral (Oradea, Romania).

Family

According to the Illuminated Chronicle, Stephen had no "wish to marry a lawful wife but took to himself concubines and harlots". However, his advisors, "grieving that the kingdom was in a sorry state and the King without a heir", persuaded him to marry. They chose a daughter of the late Robert I of Capua as their monarch's wife, although her name was not recorded. Stephen died childless.

The following family tree presents Stephen's ancestors and some of his relatives who are mentioned in the article.

*Whether Géza's first or second wife was his children's mother is uncertain.

References

Sources

Primary sources

Cosmas of Prague: The Chronicle of the Czechs (Translated with an introduction and notes by Lisa Wolverton) (2009). The Catholic University of America Press. .
Deeds of John and Manuel Comnenus by John Kinnamos (Translated by Charles M. Brand) (1976). Columbia University Press. .
O City of Byzantium, Annals of Niketas Choniatēs (Translated by Harry J. Magoulias) (1984). Wayne State University Press. .
The Hungarian Illuminated Chronicle: Chronica de Gestis Hungarorum (Edited by Dezső Dercsényi) (1970). Corvina, Taplinger Publishing. .

Secondary sources

1101 births
1131 deaths
House of Árpád
Kings of Hungary
Burials at Oradea Cathedral, Crişana
Kings of Croatia
Hungarian twins
12th-century Hungarian people